Vinkuran is a village in the municipality of Medulin, in southern Istria in Croatia. In 2011 it had a population of 672.

References

Populated places in Istria County